Ectoedemia reichli is a moth of the family Nepticulidae. It is found in Greece, the Czech Republic, northern Italy, Slovakia, Croatia and Switzerland.

Adults are on wing from late May to mid-June in Greece and from late June to early August elsewhere.

The host plant is unknown.

External links
Fauna Europaea
Western Palaearctic Ectoedemia (Zimmermannia) Hering and Ectoedemia Busck s. str. (Lepidoptera, Nepticulidae): five new species and new data on distribution, hostplants and recognition

Nepticulidae
Moths of Europe
Moths described in 1998